The 2021–22 South Alabama Jaguars women's basketball team represented the University of South Alabama during the 2021–22 NCAA Division I women's basketball season. The basketball team, led by eighth-year head coach Terry Fowler, played all home games at the Mitchell Center along with the South Alabama Jaguars men's basketball team. They were members of the Sun Belt Conference.

Roster

Schedule and results

|-
!colspan=9 style=| Exhibition
|-

|-
!colspan=9 style=| Non-conference Regular Season
|-

|-
!colspan=9 style=| Conference Regular Season
|-

|-
!colspan=9 style=| Sun Belt Tournament

See also
 2021–22 South Alabama Jaguars men's basketball team

References

South Alabama Jaguars women's basketball seasons
South Alabama Jaguars
South Alabama Jaguars women's basketball
South Alabama Jaguars women's basketball